Lungi is a 2019 Indian Kannada romantic love story directed by Arjun Lewis and Akshith Shetty. The film has been bankrolled by Mukesh Hegde under the Khara Entertainment banner. The film stars newbie Pranav Hegde opposite Ahalya Suresh and Radhika Rao, while Prakash Thuminadu, Vj Vineeth, Karthik Varadaraju, Deepak Rai Panaji, and Roopa Vorkady appear in supporting roles.

This film also marks the foray of popular Tulu film producer Mukesh Hegde to Sandalwood. Mukesh has earlier produced Tulu films such as Barsa and Are Marler. While Rijo P John has worked as the cinematographer for his movie, Prasad K Shetty has composed the music for Lungi.

Cast
 Pranav Hegde
 Ahalya Suresh
 Radhika Rao
 Prakash Tuminadu
 Vj Vineeth
 Karthik Varadaraju
 Deepak Rai Panaje
 Roopa Vorkady

Synopsis
Lungi is a romantic love story starring Pranav Hegde, Ahalya Suresh and Radhika. The movie is all about Rakshit's journey, how he finds the purpose of his life and love through the Lungi. Rakshit is your quintessential boy next door who wants what everyone wants, to be happy and to make his parents happy. In an unexpected turn, the father of the love of his life inspires him and helps him find a way to achieve all his dreams.

Plot
Lungi follows the life of Rakshit as he achieves all his dreams and finds the love of his life through the Lungi.

Production
The film released on 11 October 2019.

Soundtrack

References

External links 

 

2019 films
Indian romantic drama films
2010s Kannada-language films
2019 romantic drama films